The South African Railways Class 5 4-6-2 of 1912 was a steam locomotive.

In 1912, four Enlarged Karoo Class 4-6-2 Pacific type passenger steam locomotives which had been ordered by the Cape Government Railways the year before were placed in service by the newly established South African Railways. The locomotives were therefore numbered directly onto the South African Railways roster and designated Class 5.

Manufacturer
The Cape Government Railways (CGR), Natal Government Railways (NGR) and Central South African Railways (CSAR) had all prepared designs and placed orders for new locomotives shortly prior to 1912, when the South African Railways (SAR) locomotive classification and renumbering scheme was implemented.

The CGR's Enlarged Karoo, designed by H.M. Beatty, the Cape Government Railways Chief Locomotive Superintendent and built by Vulcan Foundry of Newton-le-Willows, was one of the locomotive types which were designed and ordered before the SAR was established and which ended up being delivered to the newly established national railways of the Union of South Africa. The locomotives were designated  and numbered in the range from 780 to 783. They entered service during November 1912.

Characteristics
The Class 5 was a larger and heavier version of the Class 5B, with a higher pitched boiler, Belpaire firebox, larger diameter leading and coupled wheels and larger cylinders.

The cylinders were arranged outside the bar frames, with balanced Richardson type D slide valves arranged above the cylinders and actuated by Stephenson valve gear through rocker shafts. The hind frame of the engine was of the plate type and was widened out to receive the Belpaire firebox, which itself was a notable departure from the usual practice of the CGR to use round-topped fireboxes.

Watson Standard boilers
In the 1930s, many serving locomotives were reboilered with a standard boiler type, designed by then Chief Mechanical Engineer A.G. Watson as part of his standardisation policy. Such Watson Standard reboilered locomotives were reclassified by adding an "R" suffix to their classification.

During 1935, only one of the Class 5 locomotives, no. 781, was reboilered with a Watson Standard no. 1 boiler and reclassified to Class 5R. The most obvious difference between the Class 5 and Class 5R is the absence of the Belpaire firebox hump between the cab and boiler on the reboilered locomotive.

During the reboilering process, the engine was also equipped with a superheater and underwent several other modifications. It was fitted with larger bore cylinders similar to those of the Class 15B, with piston valves and by-pass valves.

The hind end of the frame was redesigned and the bridle casting was removed and replaced by a frame plate, riveted to the main bar frame and carried through to the hind buffer beam. A new steel casting, extending across and over the main frame, added rigidity and served as a support for the boiler at the throat plate. A new design of drag box was installed. While the trailing Bissel truck remained unaltered, its side control was re-designed and a new compensating beam and support pivot was fitted.

Grease-lubricated axle boxes were fitted to all coupled wheels and new coupling and connecting rods of a heavier design were installed.

Their original boilers were fitted with Ramsbottom safety valves, while the Watson Standard boiler was fitted with Pop safety valves.

Service
The engines were placed in service on mainline passenger service between Cape Town and Touws River, where they remained until the loads became too heavy for them. From about 1928, they were used on secondary services, chiefly being employed to haul suburban passenger trains from Cape Town to the Strand and Stellenbosch.

The three Class 5 locomotives were withdrawn from service by 1942, but the sole Class 5R remained in service for another 27 years. For most of its working life, it was employed in suburban service in Cape Town, where it gained fame for the unusual achievement of being an individual locomotive which worked the same train, the Strand Express, for more than thirty years. It was only withdrawn occasionally for maintenance in the locomotive depot or for heavy repairs in the shops. During this time, it regularly attained a speed of  while en route between Cape Town and Bellville. It was sub-shedded at Sir Lowry's Pass and always had regular drivers.

When the Strand line was electrified in the mid-1960s, engine no. 781 was transferred to the Eastern Transvaal System for a short spell as a shunting engine at Nylstroom and in helper service between Naboomspruit and Nylstroom, before being transferred to Capital Park in Pretoria. Here it was at times used for menial tasks such as shed pilot to move engines around the Depot. From there, it was transferred to the Western Transvaal System and briefly stationed at Springs on the East Rand from where it worked the passenger service to Nigel. It spent its last years in service as station pilot at Germiston until it was withdrawn in 1969.

After withdrawal from service, it was returned to the Salt River Shops in Cape Town for use in the training of apprentice fitters, until it was moved to De Aar to be maintained for preservation.

Preservation
Of the Class 5r, one survived into preservation. By 2019

Illustration
The main picture shows the retired Class 5R no. 781 at De Aar in 1978, while the following illustrate the differences in appearance due to modifications during the lifespan of the Class. The last picture of the reboilered no. 781 dates to the 1950s, by which time the original enormous headlight had been replaced.

References

1280
1280
1280
4-6-2 locomotives
2′C1′ n2 locomotives
Vulcan Foundry locomotives
Cape gauge railway locomotives
Railway locomotives introduced in 1912
1912 in South Africa
2′C1′ h2 locomotives